Sir Clive Haydn Martin,  (born 20 March 1935) is a British businessman who was Lord Mayor of London from 1999 to 2000.

Martin was born in London to Thomas Stanley and Dorothy Gladys Martin. He was educated at St Albans School, Hertfordshire, Haileybury and the London College of Printing.  He completed National Service in the Royal Engineers, was commissioned and appointed OBE. He served in and commanded the Honourable Artillery Company earning the Territorial Decoration, and was appointed in 1999 Honorary Colonel of 135 Independent Topographic Squadron RE (Volunteers). In 1985, Martin was elected as Alderman to the City of London, and served as Sheriff of the City of London in 1996 and Lord Mayor of London for 1999–2000. He has also served as Vice-Chair of the City of London Magistrates Court.

Martin is an active English Freemason, who served from 2006 to 2007 in the very senior post of Junior Grand Warden of the United Grand Lodge of England. He was initiated in 'British Lodge' No 8 in 1984 and served as Master in the 'Lodge of Assistance' No 2773.

He is Chairman of MPG Ltd., a graphics communications business. In 2009, he was given an honorary doctorate by the University of the Arts London, and is listed as an alumnus of the London College of Communication.

References

1935 births
Living people
Businesspeople from London
People educated at St Albans School, Hertfordshire
People educated at Haileybury and Imperial Service College
Officers of the Order of the British Empire
Knights Bachelor
Deputy Lieutenants
Royal Engineers officers
Honourable Artillery Company officers
Sheriffs of the City of London
20th-century lord mayors of London
20th-century English politicians
21st-century lord mayors of London
21st-century English politicians